The women's javelin throw at the 2014 European Athletics Championships took place at the Letzigrund on 12 and 14 August.

Medalists

Records

Schedule

Results

Qualification

57.50 (Q) or at least 12 best performers (q) advanced to the Final.

Final

References

Javelin Throw W
Javelin throw at the European Athletics Championships
2014 in women's athletics